Kirsten Flipkens was the defending champion, but lost in the first round to Polona Hercog.

Lucie Šafářová won the title, defeating Marina Erakovic 6–4, 6–3 in the final.

Seeds

Draw

Finals

Top half

Bottom half

Qualifying

Seeds

Qualifiers

Qualifying draw

First qualifier

Second qualifier

Third qualifier

Fourth qualifier

References
Main Draw
Qualifying Draw

Challenge Bell
Tournoi de Québec
Can